The 1994 Intercontinental Cup was an association football match played on 1 December 1994, between Milan, winners of the 1993–94 UEFA Champions League, and Vélez Sársfield, winners of the 1994 Copa Libertadores. The match was played at the National Stadium in Tokyo. It was Milan's sixth appearance into the competition, after the victories in 1969, 1989, 1990 and the defeats in 1963 and 1993, whereas it was Vélez Sársfield's first appearance.

Omar Asad was named as man of the match.

Venue

Match details

Man of the Match:
 Omar Asad (Vélez Sársfield)

Match Ball
The Ball of the match was the Adidas Questra, originally designed to be the official match ball of the 1994 FIFA World Cup in the United States.

See also
1993–94 UEFA Champions League
1994 Copa Libertadores
A.C. Milan in European football

References

Intercontinental Cup
Intercontinental Cup
Intercontinental Cup
Intercontinental Cup (football)
Intercontinental Cup 1994
Intercontinental Cup 1994
Intercontinental Cup (football) matches hosted by Japan
Sports competitions in Tokyo
1994 in Tokyo
December 1994 sports events in the United States
1994 in association football